The Adventures of Nellie Bly is a 1981 American made-for-television drama film starring Linda Purl as 19th century journalist Nellie Bly and human rights crusader. The film was directed by Henning Schellerup. It was filmed in 1979 and aired on NBC June 11, 1981. The film was also known as The Amazing Nellie Bly.

Plot
It is 1889 and Nellie Bly, a young female journalist, champions causes for the downtrodden. Feisty, she is ahead of her time as an investigative journalist. She is somewhat restless as well and soon decides make a name for herself by traveling around the world inside of 80 days. This in an effort to make real Jules Verne Around the World in Eighty Days. Bly uses every mode of transportation then <1889> available to her.

Cast
Linda Purl - Nellie Bly
Gene Barry - John Cockerill
Ray Buktenica - Kenny Thompson
J. D. Cannon - Boss James J. Palmer
John Randolph - Joseph Pulitzer
Paul Sylvan - Johnny Neesen
Cliff Osmond - Stanfil
Betsy Slade - Rose Woods
Elayne Heilveil - Angela Harris
Fran Ryan - Mrs. Roman
Milton Selzer - Dr. Woodville
Peg Stewart - Mrs. Long
Betty Barry - Grace Palmer
Michael Ruud - Horrigan
Katherine Klekas - Miss Levy

Production
Parts of the film were shot in Salt Lake City and Park City, Utah.

References

External links

1981 television films
1981 films
American drama television films
1981 drama films
Biographical television films
American biographical films
Films set in the 1880s
Films shot in Utah
Around the World in Eighty Days
Films directed by Henning Schellerup
1980s American films